Joey Barrington (born 18 January 1979) is a former professional squash player from England and currently the lead commentator for the PSA World Tour. He is the son of the squash player Jonah Barrington. He studied Sport and Exercise Science at Birmingham University and graduated in 2000.

References

External links 
 
 Interview at Squashsite.co.uk (Nov 2004)
 The Daily Telegraph

English male squash players
1980 births
Living people
Alumni of the University of Birmingham